Bactra psammitis is a species of moth of the family Tortricidae. It is found in Australia, where it has been recorded from South Australia and New South Wales.

The wingspan is 14–15 mm. The forewings are pale ochreous brown with numerous darker strigulae (fine streaks) on the costa, some small fuscous-brown dots on the dorsal edge and a fuscous-brown terminal line. The hindwings are whitish.

References

Moths described in 1916
Bactrini